The San Angelo PAC is a theatrical campus in San Angelo, Texas, including the Stephens Performing Arts Center and Murphey Performance Hall, which opened to the public after renovation in 2016 with Mark Levine as the founding Executive Director.  The complex is located downtown just behind city hall.  
 The Stephens Performing Arts Center (dedicated on September 8, 2016) is located in the renovating Coca-Cola warehouse with a new 301-seat theater space, a black box performance space, 6 ballet studios, a Pilates studio, and scene shops. The building also houses Ballet San Angelo and Be Theatre.
 The Elta Joyce Murphey Performance Hall (rededicated on October 3, 2017) is attached to City Hall, and was originally constructed in 1928. The San Angelo Symphony and Ballet San Angelo are regular users of the Performance Hall.
The first full performance season (2017/18) encompassing both performance spaces was announced on June 15, 2017.

Performance and other venues

Murphey Performance Hall
This 1322-seat theater is the largest facility on the campus of San Angelo PAC and has been renovated to accommodate both acoustic and amplified performances. Seating is on two levels — orchestra and balcony.

Brooks & Bates Theatre
This beautiful jewel-box theater provides an intimate setting for a variety of performances and cultural events. With excellent acoustics and wrapped in bamboo, The Brooks & Bates Theatre seats 300 on one level. The proscenium theater with full backstage features can accommodate nearly any artistic production on a smaller scale.

Black Box Performance Space
Built as a "black box theater," customizable for any event. The Black Box Performance Space is the home of the resident theatre company, Be Theatre.

References

External links
San Angelo Performing Arts Coalition website

Performing arts centers in Texas
Theatres in Texas